Jaish al-Ta'ifa al-Mansurah was an Iraqi Salafi insurgent group that fought against US troops and their local allies during the Iraq War. In 2006 the group aligned itself with al-Qaeda and helped establish the Mujahideen Shura Council.

History
The group was founded by Sheikh Abu Umar al-Ansari, but exactly when is uncertain.

In May 2004, Jaish al-Taif al-Mansour kidnapped Interenergoservice workers Alexander Gordienko and Andrei Meshcherakov and demanded the withdrawal of foreign forces from Iraq.

This group gained notoriety on August 31, 2005, thanks to the mortar shelling near the Al-Aim Bridge over the Tigris River, across which a Shia procession marched to the tomb of Imam Musa al-Kazim. As a result of the bombing, 7 people were killed and 35 injured, and the crush on the bridge estimated that between 953 and 1,033 people were killed and between 322 and 815 injured.

On January 15, 2006, an organization known as the Mujahideen Shura Council in Iraq announced its establishment. Jaish al-Ta'ifa al-Mansurah has been declared one of its constituent groups, along with al-Qaeda in Iraq, the Monotheism Brigades, the Sarai al-Jihad group, the al-Ghurab Brigades and the al-Ahwal Brigades.

See also
Al-Qaeda in Iraq
Iraqi insurgency
List of armed groups in the Iraqi Civil War

References

Factions in the Iraq War
Groups affiliated with al-Qaeda
Iraq War
Guerrilla organizations
Rebel groups in Iraq
Paramilitary organizations based in Iraq
2004 establishments in Iraq
2006 disestablishments in Iraq
Anti-Shi'ism